Danton's Death (Dantons Tod) was the first play written by Georg Büchner, set during the French Revolution.

History
Georg Büchner wrote his works in the period between Romanticism and Realism in the so-called Vormärz era in German history and literature. The goal of the politically liberal poets of this period was that literature of a sham existence would again become an effective organ for renewing political and social life. They were opposed to the Romantics and against the restoration of the old order from prior to the Napoleonic Wars. They fought against convention, feudalism and absolutism, campaigned for freedom of speech, the emancipation of the individual, including women and Jews, and for a democratic constitution. They created a trend-poetry and time-poetry – in other words, poetry that dealt with problems of the time and with a commitment to liberal political ideas. Other writers of this trend and period were Heinrich Heine (author of Deutschland. Ein Wintermärchen and Atta Troll. Ein Sommernachtstraum), Johann Wolfgang von Goethe (author of Faust and Erlkönig) and Franz Grillparzer (author of Weh dem, der lügt).

Büchner was in constant fear of being arrested whilst writing Danton's Tod. It only reached print in 1835 after being heavily cut and having the politics softened by sexual innuendo. Research for the play started in late 1834 and he completed a first version of the complete script in five weeks from mid-January to mid-February 1835. The same year saw a version published by Karl Gutzkow in the Literatur-Blatt of Eduard Duller's Phönix. Frühlings-Zeitung für Deutschland and a book-version in Johann David Sauerländer's Phönix-Verlag, including both the original and Duller's version and giving them the subtitle Dramatic Scenes from France's reign of terror to appease the censor. This makes it the only one of Büchner's plays to be published in his lifetime, albeit in a heavily censored version.

For a long time, no theatre dared stage the play; it did not receive its premiere until 1902, long after Büchner's death. This occurred on 5 January, at the Belle-Alliance-Theater in Berlin, in a production by the Vereins Neue Freie Volksbühne.

Analysis

Its use of numerous historical sources and extensive quotations from original political speeches meant that the play was seen in the 20th century as the precursor to documentary theatre. Until 1979 no one had explored the themes and inner connections within Büchner's work between Eros and Violence systematically – that year saw Reinhold Grimm treat it in text und kritik, Georg Büchner, and it was continued in the present Georg Büchner Jahrbuch 11 (2005–2008).

Plot summary
The play follows the story of Georges Danton, a leader of the French Revolution, during the lull between the first and second terrors. Georges Danton created the office of the Revolutionary Tribunal as a strong arm for the Revolutionary Government. With this, to be accused of anything real or imagined was to be condemned to death without trial, proofs, evidence or witnesses. Within months he knew this power was a terrible mistake and fought to have it ended. Robespierre stopped him and used the Tribunal to have Danton and all opposition killed, consolidate his power and slaughter uncounted thousands of French men, women, and children.  Ultimately he followed Danton to the guillotine.  Witnesses describe Danton as dying bravely comforting other innocents executed with him.

Second act
Danton's friends press him to fight or flee Robespierre's supporters, but Danton does not see any need to do so and does not believe that the French National Convention will dare to act against him. Danton confides the guilt he feels for the September Massacres in his wife Julie. Danton is imprisoned and led before the National Assembly, which is divided – it feels it has no choice but to acquit him. However, Robespierre and Saint-Just reverse its opinion.

Third act
The prisoners discuss the existence of God and life, and an attempt to prove that God does not exist fails. Danton's supporters are transferred to the Conciergerie. During this time the revolutionary tribunal arranges for its jury to be made up of honest and faithful men. Danton appears confidently before the tribunal, impressing the public with his willingness for justice to be done. Seeing the hearers' sympathy for Danton, the court is adjourned. The tribunal's members invent a plot to change the public's mind. At the tribunal's second sitting, the people stop supporting Danton, due to his lifestyle. Danton's liberal programme is revealed as unacceptable to the masses.

Fourth act
Danton and his supporters are condemned to death. Danton and his friend Camille Desmoulins exchange thoughts on life and death. Danton's wife Julie, to whom he has pledged to be loyal beyond death, poisons herself at their home. The people show themselves to be curious and ironic on Danton's way to the scaffold. When Lucile Desmoulins sees her husband Camille mount the scaffold, she goes mad and resolves to die too, crying "Long live the king!" and thus guaranteeing her own death sentence.

Characters

Georges Danton

He is portrayed as a man, at his ease, with innate hedonism, with respect for the recent successes of the Revolution but doubts as to its other objectives. The atmosphere around Danton is marked by wine, gaming and easy women. This is contrary to the realities of the revolution, characterised by poverty, begging, drunkenness and prostitution (1.5). Danton was once poor and owes his current wealth to a gift from the Duke of Orleans, who tried to bribe his way to the French throne and gave Danton a gift as part of this attempt (S. 74, Z. 1–13).

Danton is also portrayed as a hero who stands up against Robespierre's unnecessary killings (Einfach Deutsch; S. 73, Z. 9–12): You want bread and he throws out heads. You thirst and he leads you to the guillotine to lick up the blood. He even takes his premature death as inevitable, with a death wish: Life is evidently a burden to me, please take it away from me, I long to be there to take it off (S. 60, Z. 13–14). Danton has a strong bond of love to his wife Julie, without whom he will not die.

Maximilien Robespierre
He is shown as recognising the plight of the people, who admire him as "virtuous" and "the incorruptible". Even he is not always virtuous, as is already visible at the start of the play in his conversation with Danton. Robespierre is accused of killing people in order to distract from the ongoing famine. He is presented both as a man with a social conscience and as one who moves against Danton to convince the people of their own power. Other revolutionaries describe Robespierre's policy as that of a terrorist.

Others
Louis Legendre, Camille Desmoulins, Marie-Jean Hérault de Séchelles, Lacroix, Philippeau – Dantonist deputies in the National Convention
St Just, Bertrand Barère, Jean-Marie Collot d'Herbois – members of the Committee of Public Safety
Julie – Danton's wife
Lucile Desmoulins – Camille Desmoulins's wife
Paris – Danton's friend
Marion – a prostitute

Adaptations
It was the basis for the 1921 German silent film Danton directed by Dimitri Buchowetzki and starring Emil Jannings as Danton.
It was adapted as an opera by Gottfried von Einem, in a work also titled Dantons Tod and premiered in 1947 at the Salzburg Festival. New Sussex Opera gave the British premiere at the Brighton Festival in 1997.
It was "freely adapted" (incorporating some material from Büchner's Woyzeck) for a BBC Play of the Month in 1978 by Stuart Griffiths and director Alan Clarke, with Norman Rodway as Danton and Ian Richardson as Robespierre.
It was adapted by the English playwright Howard Brenton in 1982 as Danton's Death, using a translation by Brenton's wife, Jane Fry.
In 2010, Brenton created a new version of the play for a revival at the Royal National Theatre, directed by Michael Grandage and starring Toby Stephens as Danton.
On 13 February 2011, BBC Radio 3 premiered a radio adaptation by Simon Scardifield, with Joseph Millson as Danton and Khalid Abdalla as Robespierre, directed by Jessica Dromgoole.

Bibliography
 Georg Büchner: Sämtliche Werke und Schriften. Bd. 3 in 4 Teilbänden. Danton's Tod. Marburger Ausgabe. Hrsg. v. Burghard Dedner und Thomas Michael Mayer. Wissenschaftliche Buchgesellschaft, Darmstadt 2000. 
 Georg Büchner: Werke und Briefe. Münchener Ausgabe. Hrsg. v. Karl Pörnbacher, Gerhard Schaub, Hans-Joachim Simm, Edda Ziegler. 8. Auflage. Hanser, München 2001, S.67–133. 
 Georg Büchner: Schriften und Briefe. Dokumente. Hrsg. v. Henri Poschmann unter Mitarb. v. Rosemarie Poschmann. Bd. 1. Bibliothek Deutscher Klassiker. Bd 84. Deutscher Klassiker Verlag, Frankfurt am Main 1992, S.11–90. 
 Gerhard P. Knapp: Georg Büchner. 3. Auflage. Metzler, Stuttgart 2000. 
 Georg Büchner: Dantons Tod. Ausgabe mit Materialien, ausgewählt von Ulrich Staiger. Ernst Klett Verlag, Stuttgart 2007.

References

External links
 
 Dantons Tod Büchner's original text (in German)

1835 plays
Plays by Georg Büchner
Plays set in the French Revolution
Works about Georges Danton
German plays adapted into films
Plays adapted into operas
Plays adapted into radio programs
Plays based on real people
Cultural depictions of Georges Danton
Cultural depictions of Maximilien Robespierre
Cultural depictions of Thomas Paine